Rita Kieber-Beck (born 27 December 1958) was the Foreign Affairs Minister of the Principality of Liechtenstein. She was appointed to office in 21 April 2005, succeeding Ernst Walch, until 25 March 2009. She also was the Deputy Prime Minister of Liechtenstein.

Kieber-Beck is a member of the Progressive Citizens' Party.

References

External links
 Leaders of Liechtenstein

1958 births
Living people
Deputy Prime Ministers of Liechtenstein
Female foreign ministers
Liechtenstein diplomats
Progressive Citizens' Party politicians
21st-century women politicians
Women government ministers of Liechtenstein
Liechtenstein women diplomats
20th-century Liechtenstein politicians
20th-century Liechtenstein women
21st-century Liechtenstein politicians
21st-century Liechtenstein women